Autobahn is the high-speed intercity highways of Germany.

Autobahn is German for motorway or highway and may refer to:

Entertainment 
 Autobahn (album), a 1974 Kraftwerk album
 "Autobahn" (song), the album's title song
 Autobahn (play), a 2004 play by Neil LaBute
 The name of the fictional German band in the 1998 film The Big Lebowski

Transportation highways 
 Autobahns of Austria
 Motorways of Switzerland

Other 
 Autobahn Country Club, auto racing course in Joliet, Illinois

See also
 Audubon (disambiguation)
 Autostrada (disambiguation)